Aimar is a Navarrese masculine name and may refer to:

Given name
Aimar Olaizola 
Aimar August Sørenssen
Pablo Aimar, Argentine football player